Blokker may refer to:

 Blokker, Netherlands, a town in the Netherlands
 Blokker (store), a Dutch chain store
 Blokker Holding, a Dutch company

People with the surname
 IJf Blokker (b. 1930), Dutch musician and television actor and presenter
 Jaap Blokker (1942–2011), Dutch businessman and chief executive
 Jan Blokker (1927–2010), Dutch journalist

Jan Andries Blokker, Sr. (27 May 1927 – 6 July 2010) was a Dutch journalist, columnist, publicist, writer,[1] and amateur historian